TV Priest are an English rock band formed in London in 2019. The band consists of Charlie Drinkwater (vocals), Nic Bueth (bass and keyboard), Alex Sprogis (guitar), Ed Kelland (drums).

History
They signed to Sub Pop after only having played one gig in an industrial freezer in November 2019, with other concerts cancelled due to the COVID-19 pandemic. Their debut album, Uppers, was released on 5 February 2021 by Sub Pop. On the 17 June 2022, their second album My Other People was released by Sub Pop.

Musical style 
The band's music style has been associated with punk rock and related genre post-punk.

Members 
 Charlie Drinkwater – vocals
 Alex Sprogis – guitar
 Nic Bueth – bass and keyboards
 Ed Kelland – drums

Discography

Studio albums 
 Uppers (2021, Sub Pop)
 My Other People (2022, Sub Pop)

Singles 
 "House of York" (2020, Hand in Hive)
 "Runner Up" (2020, Hand in Hive)
 "This Island" (2020, Sub Pop)
 "Slideshow" (2020, Sub Pop)
 "Decoration" (2020, Sub Pop)
 "Press Gang" (2021, Sub Pop)
 "Lifesize" (2021, Sub Pop)
 "One Easy Thing" (2022, Sub Pop)
 "Bury Me in My Shoes" (2022, Sub Pop)
 "Limehouse Cut" (2022, Sub Pop)
 "It Was Beautiful" (2022, Sup Pop)

References 

Sub Pop artists
English post-punk music groups
Musical groups from London